Michael John Padden (born November 13, 1946) is a lawyer and politician from Spokane Valley, Washington. He is a member of the Washington State Senate representing Washington's 4th Legislative District.

Padden is well known as a "faithless elector", a Presidential Elector who casts his vote for someone other than for whom he has pledged to vote. In the 1976 U.S. presidential election, Gerald Ford, the Republican candidate and incumbent, had lost the race to Democrat and former Georgia Governor Jimmy Carter.  Rather than vote as pledged, for President Ford, Padden instead cast his vote for Ronald Reagan, who had lost the Republican nomination to Ford earlier that year.

He entered the Washington House of Representatives in January 1981 and served there until 1995 when he was appointed to serve as a district court judge in the Spokane County District Court. On June 13, 2006, Padden announced he would not run for re-election as judge. In 2007, evidence surfaced that Padden used his influence as a judge to help direct more than $7.5 million in fees and interest payments to a former employer. At Padden's request, the state Commission on Judicial Conduct has issued a statement confirming that it examined complaints about Padden's 1999 selection of a former client as the official collection agency for District Court but found nothing to support an ethics violation. The commission typically acknowledges complaints only if it imposes discipline or sanctions. The agency, however, refused to disclose how it arrived at its conclusion or what the initial examination entailed.

Padden was elected to the Washington Senate in November 2011.

References

External links
Senate website

People from Spokane Valley, Washington
Republican Party members of the Washington House of Representatives
Washington (state) state court judges
Faithless electors
Living people
Republican Party Washington (state) state senators
1946 births
21st-century American politicians
1976 United States presidential electors